To the Limit is a 2007 German documentary film written and directed by German film director Pepe Danquart, about brothers Alexander Huber and Thomas Huber climbing the El Capitan rock formation in Yosemite National Park.

Cast
Alexander Huber ...  himself
Thomas Huber ... himself
Dean Potter ... himself
Chongo ... himself (Charles Victor Tucker III)

Head Riggers
Ammon McNeely
Ivo Ninov

Awards and nominations

Film Awards

Submissions
European Film Awards 2007
Best Documentary Award (nominated)
 Deutscher Filmpreis
 Best Sound (nominated)
 Outstanding Documentary (nominated)

References

External links
 
 
 Am Limit

2007 films
German documentary films
2007 documentary films
Documentary films about sportspeople
Austrian documentary films
Documentary films about climbing
2000s German-language films
Films shot in California
Films set in California
Yosemite National Park
2000s German films